Wissam Khodor Saleh (born 2 August 1993) is a Lebanese former footballer who played as a midfielder.

Club career 
Coming through the youth sector, Saleh began his career at Shabab Arabi. In July 2013, he joined Ansar. In July 2019, Saleh was released by Shabab Arabi.

International career 
Saleh represented Lebanon internationally at youth level. In 2015, he played for the under-23 team in a friendly game against Kuwait. He also played once in the 2016 AFC U-23 Championship qualification.

Style of play 
Saleh could play as either a right-back or midfielder.

Honours
Ansar
 Lebanese FA Cup: 2016–17
 Lebanese Elite Cup: 2016

References

External links
 
 
 
 

1986 births
Living people
People from Nabatieh District
Lebanese footballers
Association football midfielders
Al Shabab Al Arabi Club Beirut players
Al Ansar FC players
Safa SC players
Lebanese Premier League players
Lebanese Second Division players
Lebanon youth international footballers
Lebanon international footballers